The Royal Assent by Commission Act 1541 (33 Hen 8 c 21) was an Act of the Parliament of England, passed in 1542, which attained Queen Catherine Howard for adultery, thereby authorising her execution. It also provided that all of Queen Catherine's assets were to be forfeited to the Crown while also creating a new method in which royal assent could be granted to legislation.

Queen Catherine was to be convicted by bill of attainder, rather than by ordinary prosecution in a court of law. However, until 1542 the Royal Assent could be granted only by the king in person, at a ceremony in which the whole text of the bill would be read aloud. King Henry decided that "the repetition of so grievous a Story and the recital of so infamous a Crime" in his presence "might reopen a Wound already closing in the Royal Bosom". To avoid this, Parliament inserted a clause in the bill of attainder, which provided that the Royal Assent could be granted by commissioners appointed for the purpose, instead of by the king in person. Initially used sparingly, the new procedure gradually became used more often until it became the usual way. The last monarch to grant Royal Assent in person was Queen Victoria in 1854.

The Act was repealed by section 2(2) of the Royal Assent Act 1967, which however preserved the Commissioners' role.

This Act was repealed for the Republic of Ireland by sections 2(1) and 3(1) of, and Part 2 of Schedule 2 to the Statute Law Revision Act 2007.

Other provisions
The 1541 Act was more than an act of attainder, however. It also made it high treason for any person who married the King (or his successors) to conceal from the monarch their previous sexual history. It became treason for any third party to conceal such knowledge for longer than 20 days after the marriage, or to incite another to have "carnal knowledge" of the queen consort, or of the wife of the monarch's son, or for the queen or princess to incite somebody to do so. These provisions were repealed by the Treason Act 1547.

See also
Treason Act 1541
High treason in the United Kingdom

Notes

References

External links
List of repeals in the Republic of Ireland from the Irish Statute Book

Constitutional laws of England
Constitution of the United Kingdom
Treason in England
Acts of the Parliament of England (1485–1603)
1541 in law
1541 in England